Velonice refers to the following places in the Czech Republic:

 Volenice (Příbram District)
 Volenice (Strakonice District)